Wicked is a 2003 musical with music and lyrics by Stephen Schwartz and book by Winnie Holzman. It is loosely based on the 1995 Gregory Maguire novel Wicked: The Life and Times of the Wicked Witch of the West, in turn based on L. Frank Baum's 1900 novel The Wonderful Wizard of Oz and its 1939 Metro-Goldwyn-Mayer film adaptation.

The show is told from the perspective of, and focuses on, the witches of the Land of Oz; its plot begins before and continues after Dorothy Gale arrives in Oz from Kansas. Wicked tells the story of two unlikely friends, Elphaba (the Wicked Witch of the West) and Galinda (later Glinda the Good Witch), whose relationship struggles through their opposing personalities and viewpoints, same love-interest, reactions to the Wizard's corrupt government, and, ultimately, Elphaba's fall from grace after becoming an animal activist.

Produced by Universal Stage Productions, in coalition with Marc Platt, Jon B. Platt, and David Stone, with direction by Joe Mantello and choreography by Wayne Cilento, the original production of Wicked premiered on Broadway at the Gershwin Theatre in October 2003, after completing pre-Broadway tryouts at San Francisco's Curran Theatre in May and June of that year. Its original stars included Idina Menzel as Elphaba, Kristin Chenoweth as Glinda, and Joel Grey as the Wizard. The original Broadway production won three Tony Awards and seven Drama Desk Awards, while its original cast album received a Grammy Award. On October 28, 2019, with its 6,681st performance, it surpassed Les Misérables to become Broadway's fifth-longest running show. A typical performance of the show takes about two hours and 30 minutes, including an intermission.

The success of the Broadway production has spawned many productions worldwide, including a long-running West End production. Wicked has broken box-office records around the world, holding weekly-gross-takings records in Los Angeles, Chicago, St. Louis, and London. In the week ending January 2, 2011, the London, Broadway, and both North American touring productions simultaneously broke their respective records for the highest weekly gross. In the final week of 2013, the Broadway production broke this record again, earning $3.2 million. In 2016, Wicked surpassed $1 billion in total Broadway revenue, joining The Phantom of the Opera and The Lion King as the only Broadway shows to do so. In 2017, Wicked surpassed The Phantom of the Opera as Broadway's second-highest grossing musical, trailing only The Lion King. Wicked had performed in 16 different countries and is still going strong.

A two-part film adaptation, directed by Jon M. Chu starring Cynthia Erivo as Elphaba, Ariana Grande as Glinda and Jonathan Bailey as Fiyero is currently in the works. The first part is set for release on  November 27, 2024, with the second part to follow a year later.

Inception and development

Composer and lyricist Stephen Schwartz discovered Maguire's 1995 novel Wicked: The Life and Times of the Wicked Witch of the West while on vacation, and saw its potential for a dramatic adaptation. However, Maguire had released the rights to Universal Pictures, which had planned to develop a live-action feature film. In 1998, Schwartz persuaded Maguire to release the rights to a stage production while also making what Schwartz called an "impassioned plea" to Universal producer Marc Platt to realize Schwartz's own intended adaptation. Persuaded, Platt signed on as joint producer of the project with Universal and David Stone.

The novel, described as a political, social, and ethical commentary on the nature of good and evil, takes place in the Land of Oz, in the years surrounding Dorothy's arrival. The story centers on Elphaba, a misunderstood, smart, and fiery girl with emerald-green skin, who grows up to become the notorious Wicked Witch of the West and Galinda, the beautiful, blonde, popular girl who grows up to become Glinda the Good Witch of the South. The story is divided into five scenes based on the location and presents events, characters, and situations adapted from L Frank Baum's The Wonderful Wizard of Oz (1900) and its 1939 film adaptation in new ways. It is designed to set the reader thinking about what it really is to be "Wicked," and whether good intentions with bad results are the same as bad intentions with bad results. Schwartz considered how best to condense the novel's dense and complicated plot into a sensible script. To this end, he collaborated with Emmy Award-winning writer Winnie Holzman to develop the outline of the plot over the course of a year, while meeting with producer Marc Platt to refine the structural outline of the show, creating an original stage piece rather than a strict adaptation of Maguire's work.

While the draft followed Maguire's idea of retelling the story of the 1939 film from the perspective of its main villain, the storyline of the stage adaptation "goes far afield" from the novel. Holzman observed in an interview with Playbill that: "It was [Maguire's] brilliant idea to take this hated figure and tell things from her point of view, and to have the two witches be roommates in college, but the way in which their friendship develops—and really the whole plot—is different onstage." Schwartz justified the deviation, saying: "Primarily we were interested in the relationship between Galinda—who becomes Glinda—and Elphaba... the friendship of these two women and how their characters lead them to completely different destinies." Other major plot modifications include Fiyero's appearance as the scarecrow, Elphaba's survival at the end, Nessarose using a wheelchair instead of being born without arms, Boq having a continuing love interest for Glinda and eventually becoming the Tin Woodman instead of Nick Chopper, cutting Elphaba's years in the Vinkus, the deletion of Liir's birth, Fiyero not having a wife and children, Doctor Dillamond being fired instead of being murdered, and Madame Morrible going to prison instead of dying.

The book, lyrics, and score for the musical were developed through a series of readings. In these developmental workshops, Kristin Chenoweth, the Tony Award–winning actress whom Schwartz had in mind while composing the music for the character, joined the project as Glinda. Stephanie J. Block played Elphaba in the workshops (she played Elphaba in the first national tour and later as a Broadway cast replacement) before Idina Menzel was cast in the role in late 2000. Earlier that year, the creators recruited New York producer Stone, who began planning the Broadway production. Joe Mantello was engaged as director and Wayne Cilento as choreographer, while designer Eugene Lee created the set and visual style for the production inspired by W. W. Denslow's original illustrations for Baum's novels and Maguire's concept of the story being told through a giant clock. Costume designer Susan Hilferty created a "twisted Edwardian" style in building more than 200 costumes, while lighting designer Kenneth Posner used more than 800 lights to give each of the 54 distinct scenes and locations "its own mood." By April 2003, the show was in rehearsals.

Following the out-of-town tryout in San Francisco in May and June 2003, which received mixed critical reception, the creative team made extensive changes before its transfer to Broadway. Holzman recalled:
Stephen [Schwartz] wisely had insisted on having three months to rewrite in between the time we closed in San Francisco and when we were to go back into rehearsals in New York. That was crucial; that was the thing that made the biggest difference in the life of the show. That time is what made the show work. 

Elements of the book were rewritten, while several songs underwent minor changes. "Which Way is the Party?," the introductory song to the character Fiyero, was replaced by "Dancing Through Life." Concern existed that Menzel's Elphaba "got a little overshadowed" by Chenoweth's Glinda, with San Francisco Chronicle critic Robert Hurwitt writing, "Menzel's brightly intense Elphaba the Wicked Witch [needs] a chance of holding her own alongside Chenoweth's gloriously, insidiously bubbly Glinda." As a result, the creative team set about making Elphaba "more prominent." In making the Broadway revisions, Schwartz recalled, "It was clear there was work to be done and revisions to be made in the book and the score. The critical community was, frankly, very helpful to us."

Synopsis

Act I
In Oz, the citizens are celebrating the death of Elphaba, the Wicked Witch of the West. Glinda the Good floats in and reveals Elphaba's past: her mother had an affair with a traveling salesman while her father, the governor of Munchkinland, was away. She gave birth to a girl with green skin, whom her father rejected at birth cursing her, with a troubled childhood ("No One Mourns the Wicked"). After being asked if she was Elphaba's friend, Glinda reminisces about their past. Years earlier, Elphaba arrives at Shiz University ("Dear Old Shiz"). Her father showered all of his affection on her younger sister Nessarose, who uses a wheelchair, and gives Nessa a pair of jeweled shoes. The headmistress of Shiz, Madame Morrible, decides to take Nessa under her wing, assigning the nerdy Elphaba and the popular Galinda to be roommates. Elphaba, anxious, uses magic to pull Nessarose's wheelchair back after Morrible attempts to depart with her sister. Morrible recognizes Elphaba's potential and decides to teach her sorcery. She tells Elphaba her powers might allow her to one day work with the Wonderful Wizard of Oz, something Elphaba has dreamed of her whole life ("The Wizard and I").

Galinda and Elphaba clash with each other in their letters to their parents and even in classes ("What Is This Feeling?"), such as history, with Doctor Dillamond, an anthropomorphic goat who, as the only Animal professor at Shiz, is beginning to suffer from discrimination. He tells Elphaba about a conspiracy to stop animals from speaking, and she wants to let the Wizard know because he could stop it ("Something Bad"). Meanwhile, a handsome roguish prince Fiyero arrives at Shiz and introduces the other students to his philosophy of not caring about life and worries. They decide to attend a party at the Ozdust Ballroom that evening. A Munchkin named Boq asks Galinda to go with him, but she convinces him to take Nessarose so she can go with Fiyero. Nessa becomes deeply enamored with Boq and convinces Elphaba to find a way to thank Galinda for her "help". At the party, Madame Morrible tells Galinda she can join her sorcery class, at Elphaba's request, and gives her a wand. Elphaba arrives wearing a hat Galinda gave her as a practical joke, only to find the other students laughing and staring while she dances alone. Galinda has a change of heart and decides to dance with her, and soon everyone joins them, allowing both girls to finally bond ("Dancing Through Life").

Later back in their dorm room, they continue to bond with secrets. Galinda decides to give her new friend a personality makeover ("Popular"). The next day, Dr. Dillamond arrives at class, explaining that he's leaving - he is no longer permitted to teach. Elphaba wants to help, but no one will stand up with her. Afterward, the students are introduced to the technical advantages of the cage, which will prevent any animal from speaking. Elphaba's anger cannot be contained and; in the ensuing chaos, she escapes alongside Fiyero, taking with them the lion cub that was imprisoned within the cage, the two of them sharing a private moment. Elphaba, alone, laments that she could never be loved by Fiyero as Galinda is ("I'm Not That Girl"). Madame Morrible arrives and tells Elphaba that the Wizard will meet her. Nessa, Fiyero, and Galinda see her off at the train station. Galinda tries to impress Fiyero by changing her name to "Glinda" in solidarity with Dr. Dillamond, but Fiyero just barely notices and says goodbye to Elphaba. Elphaba invites Glinda to the Emerald City with her ("One Short Day").

Elphaba and Glinda meet the Wizard of Oz, who is not as scary as they thought ("A Sentimental Man"). He promises Elphaba to grant her request if she proves herself. Madame Morrible appears as the Wizard's new "press secretary." She gives Elphaba a book of spells, the Grimmerie, which only the magically gifted can read. Elphaba is asked to perform a levitation spell on the Wizard's monkey servant, Chistery, but it makes Chistery very painfully sprout wings. She discovers that the Wizard is behind the suppression of the Animals and that he is a fraud who only creates a bunch of lies so he can continue on in power. She flees the Wizard's chamber, and Morrible warns all of Oz that Elphaba is a "wicked witch." After she refuses to take Glinda's advice to go back and apologise, Elphaba decides to go off to do what's right for her. She repeats the effect of the levitation spell on a broom and flies away from the Emerald City, leaving Glinda behind ("Defying Gravity").

Act II
There has been a time skip, and now Elphaba is known as "The Wicked Witch of the West." The Wizard has given Glinda the title "Glinda the Good" and a public status as the nation's defender against Elphaba. Fiyero has become captain of the guard and tries to find Elphaba. He reluctantly agrees to marry Glinda. A press conference to celebrate their engagement is hijacked by the crowd's panicked rumors about Elphaba; one saying that she can be melted by water. Glinda maintains a cheerful front for the press but secretly regrets her decisions ("Thank Goodness").

Elphaba visits Nessarose, now the governor of Munchkinland after the death of their father. Nessa has taken away the Munchkins' rights so that Boq can't leave her. Elphaba tries to convince her to join her against the Wizard, but Nessa is consumed by her problems. Elphaba tries to help by enchanting the jeweled shoes and giving Nessa the power to walk. Nessa thinks Boq will love her now, but he sees this as proof that she no longer needs him and wants to tell Glinda of his love for her before she marries Fiyero. Nessa takes the Grimmerie to cast a spell to make Boq fall in love with her. She pronounces the words wrong and accidentally shrinks Boq's heart. She cries to Elphaba so she can save him and prevent Nessa from having to "live a life of loneliness" ("The Wicked Witch of the East"). Elphaba works another spell to save his life, transforming him into a Tin Man. Horrified Boq flees in shock and Nessa blames Elphaba.

Elphaba returns to the Emerald City to free the monkey servants and encounters the Wizard. He admits that he is an ordinary man and offers to redeem Elphaba's reputation ("Wonderful"). Even though she initially accepts his offer, when she discovers Dr. Dillamond who has lost the power of speech, Elphaba angrily accuses the Wizard, before he calls the guards to arrest her. Fiyero helps Elphaba escape and leaves with her. Heartbroken, Glinda tells the Wizard and Morrible that the only way to capture Elphaba is to make her believe her sister is in trouble. Morrible then uses her magic to summon a tornado. ("I'm Not That Girl (Reprise)").

Hidden away in a natural surrounding, Elphaba and Fiyero express their love for each other ("As Long As You're Mine"). Their happiness is interrupted by a tornado carrying a house. Elphaba and Glinda reunite at the spot where Nessa has just been crushed by a house with a girl named Dorothy inside. After a fight between the two witches, the Wizard's guards arrive. Fiyero holds Glinda hostage as Elphaba flees. Glinda pleads for the guards not to harm him as she knows he wouldn't really harm her, but they escort Fiyero to a nearby cornfield. At Kiamo Ko, Elphaba casts a spell to save Fiyero but is crestfallen by the limitations of her power. She finally accepts her reputation as a wicked witch ("No Good Deed").

Meanwhile, the citizens of Oz, led by Madame Morrible and Boq the Tin Man, set off to destroy Elphaba. Glinda realizes that Madame Morrible was responsible for Nessa's death and that the situation and rumors have already gone too far. But when she confronts her, she tells her that there is also blood on her hands and advises her to smile and wave as the citizens set out to Kiamo Ko ("March of the Witch Hunters"). Elphaba captures Dorothy, refusing to release her until she relinquishes Nessa's slippers, the only thing left of her deceased sister. Glinda arrives to warn Elphaba of the danger and begs her to free Dorothy. Elphaba refuses until she receives a letter concerning Fiyero. She decides to surrender and the two women forgive each other of all allowances. Elphaba gives the Grimmerie to Glinda and they embrace one final time before saying goodbye forever, realizing how much they've changed because they knew each other ("For Good"). Elphaba forces Glinda to hide, and she watches from the shadows as Dorothy throws a bucket of water on Elphaba, melting her. The only remains of her are her pointy hat and the Green Elixir that she had slept with under her pillow.

Back at the Emerald City, Glinda confronts the Wizard with Elphaba's bottle, which he recognizes as his own; he was Elphaba's biological father and the cause of her green skin. Glinda banishes the Wizard from Oz and throws Morrible into prison for murdering Nessarose and accusing Elphaba as a wicked witch. Meanwhile, Dorothy's friend, Fiyero (now a scarecrow) comes to the spot where Elphaba melted. He knocks on the floor; Elphaba steps out from a trap door, apparently having faked her death, and they embrace. She regrets that she will never see Glinda again. Back outside the Wizard's palace, Glinda informs the People of Oz that the Wicked Witch is dead and that she will earn her title as "Glinda the Good". As the people celebrate and Glinda mourns quietly, Elphaba and Fiyero leave Oz ("Finale").

Casts

Original casts

Notable replacements

Broadway (2003–)
Elphaba: Shoshana Bean, Eden Espinosa, Ana Gasteyer, Julia Murney, Stephanie J. Block, Kerry Ellis, Marcie Dodd, Nicole Parker, Dee Roscioli, Mandy Gonzalez, Teal Wicks, Jackie Burns, Willemijn Verkaik, Lindsay Mendez, Caroline Bowman, Rachel Tucker, Jennifer DiNoia, Jessica Vosk, Brandi Chavonne Massey, Lindsay Pearce, Saycon Sengbloh (s/b), Lisa Brescia (s/b), Donna Vivino (s/b), Lilli Cooper (s/b), Kristy Cates (u/s), Caissie Levy (u/s), Vicki Noon (u/s), Carla Stickler (u/s), Desi Oakley (u/s)
Glinda: Jennifer Laura Thompson, Megan Hilty, Kate Reinders, Kendra Kassebaum, Annaleigh Ashford, Alli Mauzey, Erin Mackey, Katie Rose Clarke, Chandra Lee Schwartz, Jenni Barber, Kara Lindsay, Patti Murin, Amanda Jane Cooper, McKenzie Kurtz, Laura Bell Bundy (s/b), Kate Fahrner (s/b), Allie Trimm (s/b), Melissa Fahn (u/s), Megan Sikora (u/s)
Fiyero: Kristoffer Cusick, Taye Diggs, Joey McIntyre, Sebastian Arcelus, Aaron Tveit, Kevin Kern, Andy Karl, Kyle Dean Massey, Richard H. Blake, Derek Klena, Justin Guarini, Ashley Parker Angel, Curt Hansen, Ryan McCartan 
The Wonderful Wizard of Oz: George Hearn, Ben Vereen, David Garrison, Lenny Wolpe, Tom McGowan, Fred Applegate, Peter Scolari, Kevin Chamberlin, Michael McCormick, Cleavant Derricks, John Dossett, Sean McCourt (u/s), Eddie Korbich (u/s)
Madame Morrible: Rue McClanahan, Carol Kane, Jayne Houdyshell, Miriam Margolyes, Rondi Reed, Mary Testa, Michele Lee, Judy Kaye, Sheryl Lee Ralph, Isabel Keating, Nancy Opel, Alexandra Billings, Michele Pawk
Nessarose: Jenna Leigh Green, Catherine Charlebois, Kelli Barrett, Arielle Jacobs, Eden Espinosa (u/s), Megan Sikora (u/s), Carla Stickler (u/s), Desi Oakley (u/s)
Boq: Randy Harrison, Robb Sapp, Alex Brightman, Taylor Trensch, Robin de Jesús, Clyde Alves (u/s)
Doctor Dillamond: Sean McCourt, Timothy Britten Parker, K. Todd Freeman, Michael Genet, Martin Moran, Jamie Jackson, Clifton Davis, Eddie Korbich (u/s)

1st & 2nd US National Tours (2005–)
Elphaba: Kristy Cates, Julia Murney, Shoshana Bean, Dee Roscioli, Victoria Matlock, Carmen Cusack, Caissie Levy, Teal Wicks, Lisa Brescia, Donna Vivino, Vicki Noon, Eden Espinosa, Marcie Dodd, Jackie Burns, Nicole Parker, Alison Luff, Jennifer DiNoia, Jessica Vosk, Coleen Sexton (s/b), Carrie Manolakos (s/b), Carla Stickler (s/b), Emmy Raver-Lampman (s/b), Lilli Cooper (s/b), Jenna Leigh Green (u/s)
Glinda: Erin Mackey, Katie Rose Clarke, Kate Fahrner, Annaleigh Ashford, Chandra Lee Schwartz, Alli Mauzey, Amanda Jane Cooper, Patti Murin, Jennifer Gambatese, Hayley Podschun, Gina Beck, Kara Lindsay, Melissa Fahn (u/s), Rachel Potter (u/s), Lauren Zakrin (u/s) 
Fiyero: Kristoffer Cusick, Sebastian Arcelus, Richard H. Blake, Colin Hanlon, Kyle Dean Massey, Curt Hansen, Nick Adams, Ashley Parker Angel, Adam Lambert (u/s)
The Wonderful Wizard of Oz: Ben Vereen, Lee Wilkof, Lenny Wolpe, Richard Kline, Don Amendolia, Tom McGowan, Mark Jacoby, Paul Kreppel, John Davidson, Tim Kazurinsky, Stuart Zagnit, Fred Applegate, Jason Graae, Cleavant Derricks, John Bolton, Matthew Stocke (u/s), Tim Talman (u/s)
Madame Morrible: Carole Shelley, Alma Cuervo, Barbara Robertson, Jo Anne Worley, Patty Duke, Jayne Houdyshell, Kim Zimmer, Alison Fraser, Isabel Keating, Judy Kaye, Lisa Howard, Brooke Elliott (u/s)
Nessarose: Deedee Magno Hall, Summer Naomi Smart, Marcie Dodd, Catherine Charlebois, Carla Stickler (u/s)
Boq: Alex Wyse, Andy Mientus, Robin de Jesús
Doctor Dillamond: K. Todd Freeman, William Youmans, Martin Moran, Clifton Davis, Michael Genet, Matthew Stocke (u/s), Tim Talman (u/s)

West End (2006–)
Elphaba: Kerry Ellis, Alexia Khadime, Rachel Tucker, Louise Dearman, Willemijn Verkaik, Alice Fearn, Jennifer DiNoia, Emma Hatton, Laura Pick, Lucie Jones, Cassidy Janson (s/b), Ashleigh Gray (s/b), Katie Rowley Jones (u/s), Natalie McQueen (u/s)
Glinda: Dianne Pilkington, Louise Dearman, Gina Beck, Savannah Stevenson, Suzie Mathers, Sophie Evans, Lucy St. Louis, Sarah Earnshaw (s/b), Caroline Keiff (u/s),
Fiyero: Oliver Tompsett, Lee Mead, Mark Evans, Matt Willis, Ben Freeman, Bradley Jaden, David Witts, Alistair Brammer, Antony Hansen (u/s)
The Wonderful Wizard of Oz: Desmond Barrit, Clive Carter, Sam Kelly, Tom McGowan, Mark Curry, Martin Ball, Andy Hockley, Gary Wilmot, Chris Jarman (u/s)
Madame Morrible: Susie Blake, Harriet Thorpe, Julie Legrand, Louise Plowright, Liza Sadovy, Anita Dobson, Kim Ismay, Sophie-Louise Dann
Nessarose: Caroline Keiff, Natalie Anderson, Cassidy Janson (u/s), Sarah Earnshaw (u/s), Natalie McQueen (u/s)
Doctor Dillamond: Paul Clarkson, Steven Pinder, Chris Jarman

Melbourne (2008–2015)
Elphaba: Jemma Rix, Pippa Grandison, Carmen Cusack (s/b)
Glinda: Suzie Mathers
Fiyero: David Harris
The Wonderful Wizard of Oz: Bert Newton, Reg Livermore, Simon Gallaher
Madame Morrible: Geraldine Turner

1st, 2nd, & 3rd UK/Ireland National Tours (2013–)
Elphaba: Ashleigh Gray, Laura Pick
The Wonderful Wizard of Oz/Doctor Dillamond: Steven Pinder

Musical numbers

Act I

 "No One Mourns the Wicked" — Glinda, Ozians, Elphaba's Mother, Elphaba's Father, Midwife and Salesman
 "Dear Old Shiz" — Students and Glinda
 "The Wizard and I" — Madame Morrible and Elphaba
 "What Is This Feeling?" — Galinda, Elphaba and Students
 "Something Bad" — Doctor Dillamond and Elphaba
 "Dancing Through Life" — Fiyero, Boq, Nessarose, Elphaba and Galinda
 "Popular" — Glinda
 "I'm Not That Girl" — Elphaba
 "One Short Day" — Elphaba, Glinda, Show Chorus and Citizens of the Emerald City
 "A Sentimental Man" — Wizard
 "Defying Gravity" — Elphaba, Glinda, Guards and Ozians

Act II

 "No One Mourns the Wicked" (Reprise) – Ensemble
 "Thank Goodness" — Glinda, Madame Morrible and Ozians
 "The Wicked Witch of the East" — Nessarose, Elphaba and Boq
 "Wonderful" — Wizard and Elphaba
 "I'm Not That Girl" (Reprise) — Glinda
 "As Long As You're Mine" — Elphaba and Fiyero
 "No Good Deed" — Elphaba
 "March of the Witch-Hunters" — Ensemble and Boq
 "For Good" — Elphaba and Glinda
 "Finale" — Glinda, Ensemble and Elphaba

Note: "The Wicked Witch of the East" is the only major piece to not be featured on the cast recording, as the producers felt "the song included too much dialogue and would give some of the plot away to people who have not seen the show."

Music and recordings

Music analysis

The score of Wicked is heavily thematic, bearing in some senses more resemblance to a film score than a traditional musical score. While many musical scores employ new motifs and melodies for each song with little overlap, Schwartz integrated a handful of leitmotifs throughout the production. Some of these motifs indicate irony – for example, when Glinda presents Elphaba with a "ghastly" hat in "Dancing Through Life," the score reprises a theme from "What Is This Feeling?" a few scenes earlier.

Two musical themes in Wicked run throughout the score. Although Schwartz rarely reuses motifs or melodies from earlier works, the first – Elphaba's theme – came from The Survival of St. Joan, on which he worked as musical director. "I always liked this tune a lot and I never could figure out what to do with it," he remarked in an interview in 2004. The chord progression that he first penned in 1971 became a major theme of the show's orchestration. By changing the instruments that carry the motif in each instance, Schwartz enables the same melody to convey different moods. In the overture, the tune is carried by the orchestra's brass section, with heavy percussion. The result is, in Schwartz' own words, "like a giant shadow terrorizing you." When played by the piano with some electric bass in "As Long As You're Mine," however, the same chord progression becomes the basis for a romantic duet. And with new lyrics and an altered bridge, the theme forms the core of the song "No One Mourns the Wicked" and its reprises.

Schwartz uses the "Unlimited" theme as the second major motif running through the score. Although not included as a titled song, the theme appears as an interlude in several of the musical numbers. In a tribute to Harold Arlen, who wrote the score for the 1939 film adaptation, the "Unlimited" melody incorporates the first seven notes of the song "Over the Rainbow." Schwartz included it as an inside joke as, "according to copyright law, when you get to the eighth note, then people can come and say, 'Oh you stole our tune.' And of course obviously it's also disguised in that it's completely different rhythmically. And it's also harmonized completely differently.... It's over a different chord and so on, but still it's the first seven notes of 'Somewhere Over the Rainbow'." Schwartz further obscured the motif's origin by setting it in a minor key in most instances. This also creates contrast in the songs in which it forms a part, for example in "Defying Gravity," which is written primarily in the key of D-flat major. In the song "The Wicked Witch of the East," however, when Elphaba finally uses her powers to let her sister walk, the "Unlimited" theme is played in a major key.

Recordings

A cast recording of the original Broadway production was released on December 16, 2003, by Universal Music. All of the songs featured on stage are present on the recording with the exception of "The Wizard and I (Reprise)," "A Sentimental Man (Reprise)" and "The Wicked Witch of the East." The short reprise of "No One Mourns the Wicked" that opens Act II is attached to the beginning of "Thank Goodness." The music was arranged by Stephen Oremus, who was also the conductor and musical director, and James Lynn Abbott, with orchestrations by William David Brohn. The recording received the Grammy Award for Best Musical Show Album in 2005 and was certified platinum by the RIAA on November 30, 2006. The album was certified double platinum on November 8, 2010. A fifth-anniversary special edition of the original Broadway cast recording was released on October 28, 2008, with a bonus CD including tracks from the Japanese and German cast recordings, "Making Good" – a song later replaced by "The Wizard and I" – sung by Stephanie J. Block with Schwartz at the piano, "I'm Not That Girl" by Kerry Ellis (featuring Brian May on guitar), Menzel's dance mix of "Defying Gravity" and "For Good" sung by LeAnn Rimes and Delta Goodrem.

A German recording of the Stuttgart production was released on December 7, 2007, featuring a track listing and arrangements identical to those of the Broadway recording. The Japanese cast recording was released on July 23, 2008, featuring the original Tokyo cast. It is notable for being the only Cast Album of the show that includes Glinda's Finale dialogue.

Productions

Original Broadway production

Wicked officially opened on June 10, 2003 at the Curran Theatre in San Francisco, after previews began on May 28, in a pre-Broadway tryout presented by SHN. The cast included Kristin Chenoweth as Glinda, Idina Menzel as Elphaba, Robert Morse as the Wizard, Norbert Leo Butz as Fiyero, Michelle Federer as Nessarose, Carole Shelley as Madame Morrible, John Horton as Doctor Dillamond, and Kirk McDonald as Boq. Stephanie J. Block, who originally read the role of Elphaba in workshop development, was Menzel's standby during tryouts, but left before the show moved to Broadway to take a role in The Boy from Oz but she would then lead the 1st National Tour opposite Kendra Kassebaum as Glinda. The tryout closed on June 29, 2003, and after extensive retooling, the musical began previews on Broadway at the Gershwin Theatre on October 8, 2003, and made its official premiere on October 30. Most of the original production team and cast members remained with the show. Principal casting changes included Joel Grey as the Wizard, William Youmans as Doctor Dillamond and Christopher Fitzgerald as Boq.

On March 12, 2020, the show temporarily suspended production due to the COVID-19 pandemic. Performances resumed on September 14, 2021 with Lindsay Pearce as Elphaba and Ginna Claire Mason as Glinda. Chenoweth made a pre-curtain speech before the grand reopening of the show.

North American productions
In 2005, the first national tour of Wicked (called the "Emerald City Tour" by the producers) started in Toronto, Ontario, and went on to visit numerous cities throughout the United States and Canada. Previews began on March 8, and officially opened on March 31. The original touring cast included Kendra Kassebaum as Glinda, Stephanie J. Block as Elphaba, Derrick Williams as Fiyero, Jenna Leigh Green as Nessarose, Carol Kane as Madame Morrible, Timothy Britten Parker as Doctor Dillamond, Logan Lipton as Boq, and David Garrison as the Wizard. The tour concluded at the Pantages Theatre in Los Angeles on March 15, 2015 with Jennifer DiNoia as Elphaba and Chandra Lee Schwartz as Glinda

Following a limited engagement of the first national tour from April 29 to June 12, 2005, a sit-down production opened at the Oriental Theatre in Chicago immediately following the tour as the original tour set was left in Chicago so the Chicago sit-down could happen. The cast included Ana Gasteyer as Elphaba, Kate Reinders as Glinda, Rondi Reed as Madame Morrible, Kristoffer Cusick as Fiyero, Telly Leung as Boq, Heidi Kettenring as Nessarose and Gene Weygandt as the Wizard. The production closed on January 25, 2009 with Dee Roscioli as Elphaba and Annaleigh Ashford as Glinda. Three times again, the tour returned to Chicago in 2010, 2013, and 2022.

An open-ended production also appeared in Los Angeles, California, at the Pantages Theatre. Performances began on February 10, 2007, with an official opening on February 21. The cast included Megan Hilty as Glinda, Eden Espinosa as Elphaba, Carol Kane as Madame Morrible, Timothy Britten Parker as Doctor Dillamond, Jenna Leigh Green as Nessarose, Adam Wylie as Boq, Kristoffer Cusick as Fiyero, and John Rubinstein as the Wizard. The production closed on January 11, 2009 with Hilty and Espinosa, after 791 performances and 12 previews.

A San Francisco production of Wicked officially opened February 6, 2009, at SHN's Orpheum Theatre, following previews from January 27. The cast included Teal Wicks as Elphaba, Kendra Kassebaum as Glinda, Nicolas Dromard as Fiyero, Carol Kane as Madame Morrible, David Garrison as the Wizard, Deedee Magno Hall as Nessarose, Tom Flynn as Doctor Dillamond, and Eddy Rioseco as Boq. The production closed on September 5, 2010 with Marcie Dodd as Elphaba and Alli Mauzey as Glinda, after 660 performances and 12 previews.

The second national tour of Wicked (called the "Munchkinland Tour") began in 2009 with previews on March 7 and official opening night on March 12 at the Barbara B. Mann Performing Arts Hall in Fort Myers, Florida. The original cast starred Marcie Dodd as Elphaba, Heléne Yorke as Glinda, Colin Donnell as Fiyero, and Tom McGowan as the Wizard. The production was suspended in March 2020 due to the COVID-19 pandemic. It resumed performances on August 3, 2021 with Talia Suskauer as Elphaba, Alison Bailey as Glinda and Curt Hanson as Fiyero. The production celebrated its 5,000th performance on July 30, 2022.

London

A London production began previews at the Apollo Victoria Theatre from September 7, and with an opening night on September 27, 2006. It celebrated its 10th anniversary in 2016 with a special curtain call featuring former West End cast members. The production was tailored slightly for a British audience, including minor creative changes to dialogue, choreography and special effects. A majority of them were later incorporated into all productions of Wicked, including the Broadway production and the two national tours.

The West End production reunited the show's original creative team. Original London cast members included the return of Menzel as Elphaba, Helen Dallimore as Glinda, Miriam Margolyes as Madame Morrible, Adam Garcia as Fiyero, Martin Ball as Doctor Dillamond, James Gillan as Boq, Katie Rowley Jones as Nessarose and Nigel Planer as the Wizard. After her limited engagement, which ended on December 30, 2006, Menzel was succeeded on January 1, 2007 by Kerry Ellis, who became the first British woman to play Elphaba.

The production suspended performances on March 16, 2020, due to the COVID-19 Pandemic. It resumed performances on September 15, 2021, in time for the production's 15th anniversary. Sophie Evans, who was a maternity cover for Helen Woolf and Laura Pick, reopened the show and left when the cast changed on January 30, 2022. Woolf returned from maternity leave and Lucie Jones took over as Elphaba.

The show, which is already the 9th longest-running West End musical in history, celebrated its 6,000th performance on July 7, 2022.

UK/Ireland tours
The show began its first UK/Ireland tour on September 12, 2013 at the Palace Theatre in Manchester, where it is played to November 16. It then toured the UK and Ireland before concluding in Salford on July 25, 2015.

A second UK/Ireland tour began in December 2017 and ended in January 2019. The cast included Amy Ross as Elphaba, Helen Woolf as Glinda, Aaron Sidwell as Fiyero, and Steven Pinder as the Wizard/Dillamond.

A third UK/Ireland tour begins on 7 December 2023 at the Edinburgh Playhouse, in Edinburgh where it's playing to 14 January 2024. It then tours the UK and Ireland before flying into its final location at the Manchester Palace Theatre in Manchester on 3 December 2024 and concluding on 12 January 2025. Pick will return to lead the tour as Elphaba with further casting to be announced.

International tour
Wicked'''s international tour opened on July 13, 2016 at the Alhambra Theatre in Bradford, England. Jacqueline Hughes starred as Elphaba, with Carly Anderson as Glinda and Bradley Jaden as Fiyero. Alongside them are Steven Pinder as the Wizard and Dillamond, Kim Ismay as Madame Morrible, Emily Shaw as Nessarose, and Iddon Jones as Boq.

 German productions 
Renamed Wicked: Die Hexen von Oz (Wicked: The Witches of Oz), the German production of Wicked began previews on November 1, 2007 and opened on November 15, at the Palladium Theater in Stuttgart. Willemijn Verkaik played Elphaba, Lucy Scherer played Glinda. The production was produced by Stage Entertainment and closed on January 29, 2010, and transferred to Oberhausen where previews began at the Metronom Theater am CentrO on March 5, 2010, with an opening night of March 8. The show closed on September 2, 2011.

On September 5, 2021 a brand new non-replica production opened at the Neue Flora Theatre in Hamburg, produced by Stage Entertainment, which previously had presented the show in Stuttgart, Oberhausen, and The Hague. Vajèn van den Bosch and Jeannine Wacker have been cast as Elphaba and Glinda respectively.

Australian productions

An Australian production officially opened on July 12, 2008, with previews commencing June 27 at the Regent Theatre in Melbourne.

Amanda Harrison was originally cast as Elphaba, with Lucy Durack as Glinda. The original cast consisted of Rob Mills as Fiyero, Anthony Callea as Boq, Rob Guest as the Wizard, Maggie Kirkpatrick as Madame Morrible, Penny McNamee as Nessarose and Rodney Dobson as Doctor Dillamond. Guest unexpectedly died of a stroke months into the Melbourne season, with the role being taken up by Bert Newton.

Closing in Melbourne August 9, 2009, the show transferred to Sydney's Capitol Theatre. Previews began on September 5, 2009, with the official opening on September 12. Shortly into the run, Harrison was forced to leave the role of Elphaba due to an illness, so current standby Jemma Rix and Australian theatre veteran Pippa Grandison began to share the role, each appearing in four shows per week. Eventually, it was confirmed that she would not be returning to the cast.

Closing in Sydney September 26, 2010, the production embarked on a national Australian tour which began at the QPAC Lyric Theatre in Brisbane. After a two-week delay due to the Queensland floods, performances began January 25, 2011, and ran until April 2. Rix became the sole lead Elphaba with David Harris joining as the new Fiyero. The touring production then moved to the Festival Centre in Adelaide, running from April 14 until June 4, 2011, with the final leg of the tour playing the Burswood Theatre in Perth, from June 19 to September 11, 2011, wrapping up more than three years of performances in Australia.

An Asian tour began at Singapore's Grand Theater in Marina Bay from December 6, 2011 with Suzie Mathers taking over as Glinda opposite Rix. After the Singapore engagement of the tour closed April 22, 2012, performances began in Seoul, Korea from May 31 through October 6, 2012. The show then made its premiere in New Zealand, with previews taking place on September 17, 2013, and the official opening night on September 21. The Auckland run concluded on November 24, 2013, where it played the Civic Theatre. The cast then moved on to the Main Theater of the Cultural Center of the Philippines in Manila on a limited run from January 22 through March 9, 2014 after having been extended from its original closing date.

At the time of the Wicked’s 10th Anniversary on Broadway, the show announced it would return to Australia for a commemorative national tour, beginning in Melbourne on May 10, 2014. Durack returned as Glinda, with Rix continuing as Elphaba. The final cast included Mathers (who had returned once Durack announced her pregnancy) as Glinda, Steve Danielsen as Fiyero, Simon Gallaher as the Wizard, Edward Grey as Boq, Emily Cascarino as Nessarose, Glen Hogstrom as Doctor Dillamond and original cast members Rix as Elphaba and Kirkpatrick as Madame Morrible. After seven years and close to 2,000 performances across 8 different cities internationally, Wicked closed indefinitely at the Burswood Theatre in Perth on June 28, 2015. At the time of the show's 20th anniversary on Broadway, Wicked will return to Australia in 2023 with an exclusive season in at the Sydney Lyric Theatre in August. Further information and casting are to be announced.

Subsequent international productions
A condensed thirty-minute version of the musical played at Universal Studios Japan in Osaka, Japan. Rix was part of the original cast, alternating the role of Elphaba with Jillian Giaachi and Taylor Jordan. The show, which opened on July 12, 2006, featured the preliminary storyline of Act 1 but Fiyero, Madame Morrible, Boq, Nessarose and Doctor Dillamond were absent and there were considerable changes in sets and costumes. The final performance took place on January 11, 2011. A Japanese production by the Shiki Theatre Company opened in Tokyo, Japan, on June 17, 2007, and subsequently moved to Osaka, Fukoka and Nagoya, before closing in Sapporo on November 6, 2016.

Another production, which was notable for not being a replica of the original Broadway staging, opened at the City Theatre in Helsinki, Finland on August 26, 2010 after a preview performance took place on August 24 of that year. Directed by Hans Berndtsson, the cast includes Maria Ylipää as Elphaba, with Tuukka Leppanen as Fiyero. The second non-replicated production ran in Copenhagen, Denmark from January 12 until May 29, 2011, and was presented by Det Ny Teater.

A Dutch-language production began previews at the Circustheater in The Hague, The Netherlands on October 26, 2011 and was produced by Joop van den Ende Theaterproducties/Stage Entertainment. The official opening took place on November 6. Verkaik reprised her role of Elphaba from the German productions, becoming the first actress to play the role in two different languages. The first Spanish-language production opened in Mexico City, Mexico on October 17, 2013, following previews from October 10. Produced by OCESA Teatro, the replica production played at the Teatro Telcel. The first Korean-language production began performances in Seoul on November 22, 2013 and is an all-new replica production. This production, located at the Charlotte Theater in Seoul, ran from November 22, 2013, to October 5, 2014.

In November 2015, the company "Time For Fun," a leading company in the entertainment market in Latin America, announced the adaptation of the musical in Brazil, that debuted in March 2016 at the Renault Theatre in São Paulo. It is the largest stage that the musical has been mounted on yet. Despite the production closing on December 18, 2016, on November 12, 2018 a Brazilian revival production of the show was announced, this time in Rio de Janeiro's entertainment center Cidade das Artes. Though it was expected to begin performances in mid 2019, after the announcement no news was released and the production was never realized.

At the end of 2020, while all Wicked productions worldwide were halted due to the outbreak of the Covid-19 virus, a third Korean replica production of the show was announced on November 14. The show started previews in Seoul's Blue Square Theater 3 months later on February 12, 2021, which was the first Wicked performance after the Covid-19 shutdown. The production opened 4 days later on February 16, 2021, and played until May 2, 2021. It then transferred to Busan's Dream Theater, where it ran from May 20, 2021 until its closing date on June 27, 2021.

On June 30, 2022, the Shiki Theatre Company announced that a Japanese revival of the show is scheduled to start performances in October, 2023. Not even half a year later, on October 7, it was announced that Wicked will return to Australia for an exclusive 20th anniversary run, with performances starting in August, 2023 at the Sydney Lyric Theatre. They will be the first replica sit-down productions to open after Wicked reopened its main three productions (Broadway, the North American Tour and West End) post-covid in 2021. Casts for both productions are yet to be announced.

On October 19, 2022, it was announced that Wicked would get a non-replica revival in Brazil through a limited run, starting March 9, 2023, at the Santander Theater, in São Paulo, produced by Atelier de Cultura. Lead actresses from the 2016 run Ruiz and Bang were announced reprising their roles as Elphaba and Glinda, respectively. Their co-stars include Tiago Barbosa as Fiyero, Marcelo Médici as The Wizard, Diva Menner as Madame Morrible, Cleto Baccic as Doctor Dillamond, Nayara Venancio as Nessarose and Dante Paccola as Boq.

Response
Awards and nominations

The original Broadway production of Wicked was nominated for ten Tony Awards in 2004, including Best Musical, Book, Orchestrations, Original Score, Choreography, Costume Design, Lighting Design, Scenic Design while receiving two nominations for Best Actress – for Menzel and Chenoweth. Menzel won the Best Actress award, and the show also won the Tony Awards for Best Scenic Design and Best Costume Design, notably losing Best Book, Original Score and ultimately Best Musical to Avenue Q. The same year, the show won 6 Drama Desk Awards out of 11 nominations, including Outstanding Musical, Book, Director, and Costume Design.

Subsequent productions have received awards and nominations as well. The West End production received five Laurence Olivier Award nominations and later won the Audience Award for Most Popular Show at the 2010 award ceremony. The original Australian production received six Helpmann Awards out of 12 nominations, including Best Musical. Wicked was named the Best Musical of the Decade by Entertainment Weekly magazine and hailed "a cultural phenomenon" by Variety magazine. While not technically an "award," the character of Elphaba was named 79th on Entertainment Weekly's list of The 100 Greatest Characters of the Past 20 Years.

Critical reception

In its out-of-town tryout in San Francisco, audience reaction was generally positive, and although critics tended to compliment the aesthetic and spectacle of the show, they disparaged the state of its book, score, and choreography. Dennis Harvey of Variety commented positively of the "sleekly directed," "snazzily designed," and "smartly cast" production, yet still disapproved of its "mediocre" book, "trite" lyrics, and "largely generic" music while Karen D'Souza of the San Jose Mercury News wrote that "Style over substance is the real theme in this Emerald City."

The Broadway production opened on October 30, 2003, to mixed reviews from theatre critics. However, Chenoweth and Menzel received widespread acclaim for their performances as Glinda and Elphaba, respectively. Both USA Today and Time Magazine gave the Broadway production of Wicked very positive reviews, with Richard Zoglin of Time saying, "If every musical had a brain, a heart and the courage of Wicked, Broadway really would be a magical place." Elysa Gardner of USA Today described it as "the most complete, and completely satisfying, new musical I've come across in a long time." Conversely, Ben Brantley in the New York Times loved the production but panned the show itself, calling it a "sermon" that "so overplays its hand that it seriously dilutes its power," with a "generic" score. He noted that Glinda is such a showy role that the audience ends up rooting for her rather than the "surprisingly colorless" Elphaba, who is "nominally" the hero. Despite these mixed reviews, interest in Wicked spread quickly by word-of-mouth, leading to record-breaking success at the box office, as described below. Speaking to The Arizona Republic in 2006, Schwartz commented, "What can I say? Reviews are reviews.... I know we divided the critics. We didn't divide the audience, and that's what counts."

International productions have opened to different critical receptions. The West End production opened to a slightly more upbeat response. The majority of critics have appreciated the spectacle of the lavish production, and the "powerhouse" performances of actors in the roles of the two witches. However, contemporaries have characterized the production as overblown, occasionally preachy, and suffering from more hype than heart. Although Charles Spencer of The Daily Telegraph described it as "at times... a bit of a mess," he praised Holzman's script, described Kenneth Posner's lighting design as "magical" and lauded Menzel's Elphaba and Helen Dallimore's Glinda. Michael Billington of The Guardian gave it three out of five stars and remarked on the competence of all the lead actors; however, he complained that Wicked was "all too typical of the modern Broadway musical: efficient, knowing and highly professional but more like a piece of industrial product than something that genuinely touches the heart or mind." Paul Taylor of The Independent gave extremely negative remarks to his viewing of the London production, calling the attempt at topical political allegory "well-meaning but also melodramatic, incoherent and dreadfully superficial" while deploring the acting, songs and book, concluding that "the production manages to feel at once overblown and empty."

The Japanese version of Wicked by the Shiki Theatre Company (劇団四季) has won high acclaim in Tokyo, Osaka, Sapporo, and Nagoya. The original Wicked has toured in China with great popularity. A Chinese review by Harvard scholar Hansong Li has appeared in the Shanghai Review of Books.

Commercial reception

Since its opening in 2003, the original Broadway production of Wicked has broken the house record at the Gershwin Theatre twenty times. It regularly grosses in excess of $1.6 million each week, making it one of the most lucrative productions on Broadway. With a $14 million capitalization, the Broadway production took 15 months to break even, earning back its initial investment by December 21, 2004. In its first year, it grossed more than $56 million. In the week ending January 1, 2006, Wicked broke the record, previously held by the musical The Producers, for the highest weekly box office gross in Broadway history, earning $1,610,934. It has gone on to break its own record numerous times, reaching $1,715,155 in November 2006, $1,839,950, during the 2007 Christmas week, $2,086,135 for the week ending November 29, 2009, $2,125,740 just a few weeks later for the eight performances ending January 3, 2010, and over $2.2 million in the week ending January 2, 2011. In the first week of 2012, the Broadway production broke a record again, earning $2.7 million. Wicked once again broke this record in the final week of 2012 when it grossed $2.9 million. In the final weekend of 2013, Wicked became the first musical to gross $3 million in one week.Wicked's productions across North America and abroad have been equally financially successful. The Los Angeles production took the local weekly gross record, again from a performance of The Producers, bringing in $1,786,110 in the week ending March 4, 2007. The production joined its Broadway counterpart in setting a new record over Christmas 2007 with $1,949,968, with records also set in Chicago ($1,418,363), and St Louis ($2,291,608), to bring the collective gross of the seven worldwide productions to a world record-breaking $11.2 million. A new suite of records were set over Christmas 2010, with house records broken in San Francisco ($1,485,692), Providence ($1,793,764) and Schenectady ($1,657,139) as well as Broadway, bringing the musical's one-week gross in North America alone to $7,062,335.Wicked played to more than 2 million visitors in Chicago with a gross of over $200 million, making it the highest-grossing show in Chicago history by June 2007. With an opening-week gross of $1,400,000, it continually set records and became the longest-running Broadway musical in Chicago history. Producer David Stone told Variety, "we thought it [the Chicago production] would run 18 months, then we'd spend a year in Los Angeles and six months in San Francisco... but sales stayed so strong that the producers created another road show and kept the show running in Chicago." In addition, over 2.2 million saw the touring production in its first two years, which grossed over $155 million The Los Angeles production grossed over $145 million and was seen by more than 1.8 million patrons. Over the 672 performances of the San Francisco production, Wicked sold over 1 million tickets with a cumulative gross of over $75 million. While the Broadway production of Wicked welcomed its 5 millionth audience member on September 29, 2010.

International productions of Wicked have matched the extremely positive reception at the box-office. Although West End theatres do not publish audited weekly grosses, the West End production of Wicked claimed to take the record for highest one-week gross in December 2006, taking £761,000 in the week ending December 30. On June 23, 2008, the producers reported that over 1.4 million people had seen the London production since its opening, and grosses had topped £50 million; The same reports stated that the show has consistently been one of the two highest-grossing shows in the West End. For the week commencing December 27, 2010, the London production grossed £1,002,885, the highest single-week gross in West End theatre history, with over 20,000 theatregoers attending the nine performances of Wicked that week. The Melbourne production broke Australian box-office records, selling 24,750 tickets in three hours during pre-sales and grossing over $1.3 million on the first business day after its official opening. On April 27, 2009, the production passed the milestone of 500,000 patrons. When it transferred to Sydney, the production broke "all previous weekly box office records for a musical at the Capitol Theatre, grossing $1,473,775.70 in one week during October 2009.

In the week ending October 17, 2010, Wicked became only the third musical in Broadway history to exceed $500 million in total gross. By seats sold on Broadway, it ranks tenth of all time. As of September 2011, Wicked North American and international companies have cumulatively grossed nearly $2.5 billion and have been seen by nearly 30 million people worldwide. The original production still runs today and currently stands as the fifth longest-running Broadway show in history."Longest Runs on Broadway". Playbill. August 14, 2011. Wicked celebrated its 1,000th performance on Broadway on March 23, 2006. Several other productions have also reached the 1,000th performance milestone, including the first North American touring company on August 15, 2007, the Chicago company on November 14, 2007, the West End company on February 14, 2009, the Australian company on May 7, 2011 and the second North American touring company on August 4, 2011.

Marketing and promotion

The success of the Broadway production has led to the development of an auxiliary show for purposes of marketing and promotion titled Behind the Emerald Curtain. It was created by Sean McCourt—an original Broadway production cast member who played the Witch's Father—and Anthony Galde, who was a long-running swing in the Broadway company from 2004 to 2012. The tour features a ninety-minute behind-the-scenes look at the props, masks, costumes and sets used in the show, and includes a question-and-answer session with the cast members. The Broadway tour is currently led by McCourt and long-running ensemble member, Lindsay K. Northen. The tour also featured in the Los Angeles, San Francisco and Chicago sit-down productions, and were each run by different long-serving cast members of the show. The tour provides a behind-the-scenes look at what goes into putting on the show every day. Participants get a first-hand account of what it is like to be a part of the massive production that Wicked is. To create Elphaba's green skin look, 40 pots a year of the commercially available MAC Chromacake landscape green make-up is used. It is water-based for easy removal. As of 2021, it costs $800,000 a week to run the Broadway Production of Wicked 

Legacy and anniversary tributes
Two-part film adaptation

A film adaptation of Wicked had been discussed since 2004. In July 2010, it was reported that J. J. Abrams, James Mangold, Ryan Murphy, and Rob Marshall were under consideration to direct a potential film adaptation. By July 2012, Universal Studios was reported to be producing the film, with Stephen Daldry as director and Winnie Holzman, who wrote the musical's book, to pen the screenplay. Universal announced in 2016 that the film would be released in theaters on December 20, 2019, with Daldry still attached to direct, and the script to be co-written by the musical's creators, Holzman and Schwartz. In May 2017, Schwartz stated that the film would feature "at least two" new songs. On August 31, 2018, Universal put the film on hold, due to production scheduling, and gave the film adaptation of Cats, which became a box office bomb, the release date formerly held by the film. On February 8, 2019, Universal announced a new release date of December 22, 2021, for the Wicked film. On April 1, 2020, Universal put the film on hold once again due to Universal shifting release dates amidst the COVID-19 pandemic, and gave Sing 2 the 2021 release date. On October 20, 2020, it was announced that Daldry had left the production due to scheduling conflicts. In February 2021, Deadline reported that Jon M. Chu had signed on to direct the film adaptation. In July 2021, Schwartz stated that filming would begin in fall 2021 in Georgia, but filming was later postponed to March 2022 and again to June 2022. In November 2021, Ariana Grande and Cynthia Erivo were cast as Glinda and Elphaba respectively, with production originally set to begin in summer 2022 in the United Kingdom.

In April 2022, it was announced the film would be released in two parts, the first one on November 27, 2024 and the second one on Christmas Day 2025. Jon M. Chu explained why:

In June 2022, Stephen Schwartz added, while confirming that a new song will be written for one of the two films:

On July 18, 2022, it was revealed that with the filming process settled at the newly-built Sky Studios in Elstree, England, rehearsals will begin in August with principal photography beginning in November. By September 2022, Jonathan Bailey was confirmed to have been cast as Fiyero. The following month, Jeff Goldblum was reported to be in final talks to play the Wizard.

In November 2022, Schwartz revealed that Part 2 of the movie will include two new songs "to meet the demands of the storytelling." Then, on December 7, 2022, it was revealed that Ethan Slater will be playing Boq. On December 8, 2022, it was announced that Michelle Yeoh will be playing Madame Morrible, and Goldblum was confirmed to be playing the Wizard. On December 9, 2022, it was reported that Keala Settle, Bowen Yang, Bronwyn James, Aaron Teoh, Colin Michael Carmichael, and Marissa Bode had also joined the cast as Miss Coddle, Pfannee, ShenShen, Avaric, Nikidik, and Nessarose, respectively. Bode's casting as Nessarose makes her the first wheelchair-assisted actor to play the part. On December 9, 2022, Chu confirmed on Twitter that filming had begun.

15th anniversary tribute special
In October 2018, an NBC broadcast, A Very Wicked Halloween: Celebrating 15 Years on Broadway, was hosted by Menzel and Chenoweth and featured Ariana Grande, Pentatonix, Adam Lambert, Ledisi, the current Broadway company of the musical and others, singing many of the musical numbers from Wicked to a live studio audience at the Marquis Theatre in New York. The concert special was directed by Glenn Weiss.

PBS Special
On August 29, 2021, the Public Broadcasting Service (PBS) network aired a Wicked concert special, which was also hosted by Chenoweth and Menzel and featured Rita Moreno, Cynthia Erivo, Ariana DeBose, Gavin Creel, Ali Stroker, Amber Riley, Mario Cantone, Jennifer Nettles, Stephanie Hsu, Alex Newell, Isaac Cole Powell and Gabrielle Ruiz performing many of the musical numbers.

In popular culture
The success of Wicked has made several of the show's songs popular and has resulted in references to the show, characters, and songs in popular culture. The Broadway production has been featured in episodes of television programs, including Brothers & Sisters and The War at Home. For filming purposes, the Pantages Theatre in Los Angeles doubled for the Gershwin Theatre on Broadway in Ugly Betty in an episode titled "Something Wicked This Way Comes" in which Betty, the show's protagonist, goes to see Wicked on a date and accidentally stops the show. In the previous episode "Brothers," Betty gets tickets to see Wicked and discusses with a friend how much she relates to Elphaba's outcast status in a popularity and beauty-oriented environment.

Entertainer John Barrowman sang a version of "The Wizard and I" (retitled "The Doctor and I") on his 2008 tour of the UK, with adapted lyrics referring to his Doctor Who and Torchwood character Jack showing affection for The Doctor. Kerry Ellis, who played Elphaba in the West End and on Broadway, recorded "I'm Not That Girl" for the fifth anniversary edition of the original Broadway cast recording. She also recorded her own rock version of "Defying Gravity." Both songs were produced by British musician Brian May and were featured on her extended play Wicked in Rock (2008) and debut album Anthems (2010). She performed her version of "Defying Gravity" at the 2008 Royal Variety Performance, alongside May on guitar. A dance remix of her rock version of "Defying Gravity" was later released in 2011. Louise Dearman, who has played both Elphaba and Glinda in the West End, released an acoustic version of "Defying Gravity" for the Wicked edition of her album Here Comes the Sun. Her former co-star and London Elphaba Rachel Tucker also covered "Defying Gravity" on her debut album The Reason (2013). Rapper Drake and singer Mika both sampled the musical's song in their songs "Popular" and "Popular Song" respectively.

The closing song of Act I, Defying Gravity, is featured in the Glee episode Wheels, where Rachel (Lea Michele) and Kurt (Chris Colfer) sing it separately in a competition for the lead solo from the first season. It was featured again in the season five episode 100, the hundredth episode in the series, this time sung by the characters from the series, Rachel, Kurt and Mercedes (Amber Riley). Media as diverse as the anime series Red Garden, the daytime drama Passions and the Buffy the Vampire Slayer graphic novels have all parodied Wicked songs and characters.

The end of the song "Killer Instinct" in Bring It On the Musical parodies the closing notes of "No One Mourns the Wicked." The Oscar-winning song "Let It Go" from the successful 2013 Disney computer-animated musical feature film Frozen, that also won the Academy Award for Best Animated Feature, had been compared to "Defying Gravity" due to its similar theme and similar singing style, and was sung by the original Elphaba Idina Menzel. Willemijn Verkaik voiced the Dutch and German versions of the role of Elsa in Frozen and sang "Let It Go" in these two languages. This became another role originally played by Idina Menzel that Verkaik played, following her success in the German, Dutch and English language productions of Wicked. When Frozen came to Broadway, the song "Monster" (sung by Caissie Levy, who also played Elphaba) was compared to "No Good Deed" In Lego Dimensions, when Unikitty interacts with the Wicked Witch, she says “If you spent more time singing, then maybe you wouldn't be so 'wicked,' witch."

References

External links

 Official production sites
 North America
 UK
 
 
 
 Wicked at MusicalSchwartz.com, the official Stephen Schwartz fan site
 Wicked song lyrics, Allmusicals''
 9 Things You Probably Didn't Know About Wicked the Musical

2003 musicals
Broadway musicals
Fantasy theatre
Fiction about witchcraft
Laurence Olivier Award-winning musicals
Musicals based on novels
Musicals based on The Wizard of Oz
Musicals by Stephen Schwartz
Tony Award-winning musicals
West End musicals
The Wicked Years
The Wizard of Oz (1939 film)